Jimmie Dale Wooding (born February 6, 1954, in St. Louis, Missouri) is a retired decathlete from the United States, who finished seventh in the World with 8091 points at the 1984 Summer Olympics in Los Angeles, California. He is a two-time national champion (1981 and 1984) in the men's decathlon.

References 

1954 births
Living people
Indiana University of Pennsylvania alumni
American male decathletes
Track and field athletes from St. Louis
Athletes (track and field) at the 1984 Summer Olympics
Olympic track and field athletes of the United States